Union Station/South 19th Street station is a light rail station on Link light rail's T Line in Tacoma, Washington, United States. The station officially opened for service on August 22, 2003, and serves the University of Washington, Tacoma, a variety of museums, government buildings, and apartment complexes.

The station is named after the nearby and much larger Tacoma Union Station, which now serves as a courthouse. It is located near the University of Washington, Tacoma campus, Museum of Glass, Washington State History Museum, and Tacoma Art Museum. Union Station also serves as the main entryway to the Tall Ships Festival on the nearby Thea Foss Waterway.

Artwork at the station reflects the area's American Indian culture, and the manufacturing and shipbuilding that took place in the vicinity (including in many of the buildings used by UW Tacoma). Artwork includes:
 The outline of a ship's frame and American Indian fishing tools in the median by the station
 Roof of the station platform is meant to look like the ribs of a ship
 Photos and poems covering manufacturing and fishing in the area on the platform

References 

Link light rail stations in Pierce County, Washington
Railway stations in the United States opened in 2003
2003 establishments in Washington (state)
Union stations in the United States
Buildings and structures in Tacoma, Washington
Transportation in Tacoma, Washington
Railway stations in Washington (state) at university and college campuses